The noddies, forming the genus Anous, is a genus of seabirds in family Laridae which also contains the gulls, terns and skimmers.  The genus contains five species.

The noddies inhabit tropical oceans and have a worldwide distribution, ranging from Hawaii to the Tuamotu Archipelago and Australia in the Pacific Ocean, from the Red Sea to the Seychelles and Australia in the Indian Ocean and in the Caribbean to Tristan da Cunha in the Atlantic Ocean. They nest in colonies on cliffs or in short trees or shrubs, seldom on the ground. The female lays one egg in each breeding season. These birds feed on small fish which they catch by dipping their bills beneath the surface while flying; they do not plunge dive.

Taxonomy
The genus was introduced by the English naturalist James Francis Stephens in 1826. Anous is Ancient Greek for "stupid" or "foolish". Noddies are often unwary and were well known to sailors for their apparent indifference to hunters or predators. They find safety in enormous numbers.

A molecular phylogenetic study published in 2007 found that the genus Anous was a sister group to a clade containing the terns, gulls and skimmers. A study of the phylogenetic relationship between the five noddies published in 2016 found that they formed a single clade with the blue noddy and the grey noddy which were at the time in the genus Procelsterna embedded within the three species in Anous.  The authors proposed that the noddies should be merged into a single genus Anous and that Procelsterna should be considered as a junior synonym.

References

Olsen and Larsson, Terns of Europe and North America 

 
Noddies (tern)
Bird genera